Matthew Edison (born August 22, 1975) is a Canadian actor known for his roles in Fortunate Son, The Detail, and Nero Wolfe, and as Cameron Coleman in the web series Vought News Network: Seven on 7 with Cameron Coleman and the third season of The Boys.

Early life and education 
A great-great-great-grand-nephew of Thomas Edison, Edison was born in Ottawa, Ontario. He graduated from Canterbury High School and the Stella Adler Studio of Acting in New York City.

Career 
He has appeared in the television series At The Hotel and A Nero Wolfe Mystery, and in various television movies. Edison was nominated for a Dora Award for the role of Hal in Proof in Toronto at The Canadian Stage Company, and for his original play The Domino Heart, produced at Tarragon Theatre Extra Space in 2003.

In 2021, Edison starred in Vought News Network: Seven on 7 with Cameron Coleman, a web series set within the universe of The Boys, as Cameron Coleman, before reprising the role in the series' third season.

Filmography

Film

Television

Online

References

External links

1975 births
Living people
Canadian male dramatists and playwrights
Canadian male film actors
Canadian male television actors
Canadian male stage actors
21st-century Canadian dramatists and playwrights
21st-century Canadian male writers